Nagubat is an island located in the Antique province of the Philippines.

See also

 List of islands of the Philippines

References

Further reading
 

Islands of Antique (province)